Alexei Osipov (born March 31, 1938, Belev, Tula oblast, Russia) - well known Russian Orthodox theologian, professor and lecturer from Moscow Orthodox Theological Seminary. He is also a widely popular Orthodox pedagogue, publicist and defender of Russian Orthodoxy, being a slavophil, apologist of Eastern Christianity as based on teachings of Church Fathers and exposer of deficiencies of western Catholic teachings.

After finishing school he refused to enter any university and in home conditions he undertook the study of theology under the guidance of hegumen Nikon (Vorobyov) for 3 years. In 1958 he entered the 4th (final) grade of Moscow Theological Seminary, having passed exams  for the previous three years. Next year he entered Moscow Theological Academy which he finished in 1963.

Since 1965 he has been a lecturer of basic theology, since 1975 - professor.

Books
in English:
 Downloadable English translation (in Word Doc.) of Osipov´s "Soul´s life after death" (Posmertnaya Zhizn Dushi). Moscow: Danilovskiy Blagovestnik, 2005; 4th edition: Moscow, 2007.
 The search for truth on the path of reason. Moscow: Sretensky Monastery and Pokrov Press, 2009. 

in Russian:

 Translation of the order of Morning and Evening Church services by the Greek service instruction book of 1951 in comparison with Russian synodal edition (manuscript, Library of Moscow Theological Academy).
 The basics of theology (Osnovnoye bogosloviye). Course of lectures for students of Moscow Theological Academy. Moscow, 1994.
 The search for truth on the path of reason. Moscow: Danilovskiy Blagovestnik, 1997.
 Orthodox understanding of the meaning of life. Kyiv, 2001.
 Soul's life after death (Posmertnaya Zhizn Dushi). Moscow: Danilovskiy Blagovestnik, 2005; 4th edition: Moscow, 2007.

External links
 
 Videos, Audios, Books and Publications in English
 
 Biography

Russian theologians
Academic staff of Moscow Theological Academy
Eastern Orthodox theologians
1938 births
Living people
20th-century Eastern Orthodox theologians
21st-century Eastern Orthodox theologians